Pseudoborocera is a monotypic moth genus in the family Lasiocampidae erected by Yves de Lajonquière in 1972. Its single species, Pseudoborocera legrasi, described by the same author in the same year, is found in Madagascar.

References

Lasiocampidae
Monotypic moth genera